Schistocerca nitens is a species of grasshopper known by several names, including vagrant grasshopper and gray bird grasshopper. It is a close relative of the desert locust, which is in the same genus. This grasshopper is native to southern North America including Mexico and the south-western United States from California to Texas. Vagrants are occasionally found in Colorado and Nebraska, where the climate is too cold for them to reproduce, otherwise. It is also present in parts of Central and South America. It lives in many habitats including desert, woodland, and lower elevation mountainous areas. It is a large grasshopper, reaching lengths of 4 to 7 centimeters. It is mostly brown and gray spotted or patched in cryptic coloration. This species is known as a pest on ornamental plants and many types of crop plants.

Hawaiian population
It is a troublesome invasive species in Hawaii. A particularly destructive swarming event occurred on the Hawaiian island of Nihoa in 2004, wiping out some 90% of the vegetation on the island. Despite reaching high population densities, this particular species does not swarm as locusts, which is a distinct behavior accompanied by a gregarious phase change. Rather, the grasshoppers reached swarm proportions despite in solitary form, as a result of being an invasive species in an extremely favorable environment. It was probably introduced to Hawaii several decades ago and then spread through the archipelago by flying; it has the ability to fly at least 300 miles across ocean.

Life cycle
The grasshopper becomes sexually mature at 3 to 4 months of age. Any stage of its life cycle can be seen at any time of the year, but the adult is less active during the winter and fall. Mating usually occurs on warm nights in summer, and often around bright lights.

References

External links

USDA ARS Species Profile
Photo gallery

Acrididae
Insects described in 1815